Maybach Music Group (abbreviated MMG) is a record label imprint founded by American rapper Rick Ross. Maybach Music Group albums are distributed by Atlantic Records, a division of the Atlantic Records Group. Atlantic took over distribution following the expiration of a deal with Island Def Jam. As of December 12, 2012, the label releases are now distributed by Atlantic Records. 19 solo and three compilation albums have been released by Maybach Music Group, including five certified Gold albums and three certified Platinum albums .

Maybach is home to many successful artists such as Ross himself, Wale, Meek Mill, Gunplay, and Torch, Smoke Bulga among others. The label has also had seven albums debut at number one on the Billboard 200 such as Deeper Than Rap, God Forgives, I Don't, and Mastermind by Rick Ross, The Gifted and The Album About Nothing by Wale and Dreams Worth More Than Money and Championships by Meek Mill.

History

2009-2011
Maybach Music Group released its first album in the summer of 2009, which was Rick Ross' third studio album Deeper Than Rap. After the release, Ross focused more on signing artists to his label, in the process discovering musicians such as Masspike Miles & hip hop group Triple C's who consists of members Gunplay, Torch, & Young Breed. On October 27, 2009, Ross released Triple C's debut studio album Custom Cars & Cycles through Def Jam. In 2010, MMG issued Teflon Don, with another album titled Color, Cut & Clarity by Triple C's also scheduled for distribution, however was delayed and has yet to be released.

Also in 2010, Ross made an offer to rapper Wiz Khalifa to sign to Maybach Music Group. Khalifa at the time was already signed with Atlantic Records. In 2011, Ross confirmed that he intended to launch Maybach Music Jamaica along with Maybach Music Latino. He also signed Maybach Music Group's first reggae artist, Magazeen. On March 25, 2011, it was announced that R&B & Soul singer Teedra Moses had signed to Maybach Music Group via Warner Bros. Records as its first female artist. On May 23, 2011, Maybach Music Group released the album Self Made Vol. 1, featuring Rick Ross with Maybach's new roster additions, Wale, Meek Mill, Teedra Moses, Pill, and Stalley along with Torch and Gunplay of Triple C's.

2012-present
On January 2, 2012, while in the studio with Rick Ross, French Montana announced that he had signed a joint venture deal with Maybach Music Group and Bad Boy Records with Rick Ross and Diddy set to executive produce his debut album. It was announced that his debut album Excuse My French would be released in Fall 2012 through Interscope Records. On February 4, 2012, Rick Ross spoke about the departure of Pill from Maybach Music Group and revealed that Pill was never actually signed to Maybach Music Group. Pill was already signed to Warner Bros. prior to Maybach Music Group and it was Warner executives who proposed the idea of Pill joining. Ross says that they worked out a one-year deal where Pill would be part of the team and after the year was up, it would be up to Warner Bros. Records to decide if he stayed or not. 
 On May 2, 2012, Rick Ross would go on to sign Omarion to the Maybach Music Group. He also announced that Self Made Vol. 2 would be released on June 26, 2012, and God Forgives, I Don't would be released on July 31, 2012.

On June 22, 2012, while promoting Self Made Vol. 2, Rick Ross said that Gunplay signed a solo deal with Def Jam and that more material would be released from Gunplay leading up to his debut album. There have been rumors that rapper Dom Kennedy or Nipsey Hussle were in talks on joining the label but when asked about the rumors Ross stated that he was a fan of them, but is not yet signed to Maybach Music Group.  On July 12, 2012, after rumors that rapper Rockie Fresh was in talks to joining the label, Ross confirmed that Rockie Fresh was the newest addition to Maybach Music Group. Rockie Fresh released a mixtape entitled Electric Highway that dropped January 21, 2013 as his first project released under the imprint.

On December 11, 2012, Ross announced that his label, MMG was leaving Warner Bros. Records and that the label is moving to Atlantic Records. On June 2, 2013, Rick Ross revealed an album cover and announced that Maybach Music Group will be releasing their third collaboration album, Self Made Vol. 3 on August 6, 2013. On June 3, 2013, three songs, all to appear on the album, "Poor Decisions", "God Is Great" and "Oil Money Gang" were released. On June 4, 2013, a video for each of the 3 songs were uploaded to the group's official YouTube page. Self Made Vol. 3 was released to generally positive reviews on September 17, 2013. The same day Stalley released his first retail project Honest Cowboy EP. On November 6, 2013, MMG announced that they had signed Washington DC rapper Fat Trel.

Notable acts
Wale
Gunplay
 French Montana
 Omarion

Discography
The following is a list of albums released through Maybach Music Group, various album distributors are noted below.

Notes

References

American record labels
Companies based in Atlanta
Contemporary R&B record labels
American hip hop record labels
Labels distributed by Warner Music Group
Record labels established in 2009
Warner Music labels
Vanity record labels